Matthew Lambros (born February 8, 1985) is a former professional Canadian football wide receiver. He was drafted by the Toronto Argonauts in the second round of the 2009 CFL Draft. He played college football for the Liberty Flames.  He attended training camp with the Montreal Alouettes in June 2011, but was released on June 18, 2011.

Early years
Lambros was born February 8, 1985, in Calgary, Alberta.
His father, Mike Lambros, was a linebacker with the Edmonton Eskimos from 1972 to 1975. He played football for Sir Winston Churchill High School in Calgary, where he was named Rookie of the Year and was a three-year letter-winner.

On the advice of Jim Barker, who coached a football camp he attended during high school, he chose to attend Liberty University in Lynchburg, Virginia, for college. Lambros played for the Liberty Flames from 2005 to 2008, including the Flames first Big South Conference championships in 2007 and 2008. He was named to the Big South Presidential Honour Roll in 2006 and 2007.

Professional career
Lambros signed with the Argonauts on May 27, 2009, and joined the 2009 Toronto Argonauts season training camp and participated in the pre-season games. He was released from the active roster and signed to the practice roster at the beginning of the regular season but was activated ahead of the first game of the season, where he made both his first catch and first touchdown against the Hamilton Tiger-Cats on July 1, 2009. On June 4, 2010, Lambros was released by the Argonauts.

He was signed by the Montreal Alouettes on February 17, 2011, and released on June 18, 2011.

References

External links
Just Sports Stats
Liberty Flames bio
Montreal Alouettes bio

1985 births
Living people
Canadian football wide receivers
Canadian players of American football
Liberty Flames football players
Players of Canadian football from Alberta
Canadian football people from Calgary
Toronto Argonauts players